Remote viewing (RV) is the practice of seeking impressions about a distant or unseen subject, purportedly sensing with the mind. Typically a remote viewer is expected to give information about an object, event, person or location that is hidden from physical view and separated at some distance. Physicists Russell Targ and Harold Puthoff, parapsychology researchers at Stanford Research Institute (SRI), are generally credited with coining the term "remote viewing" to distinguish it from the closely related concept of clairvoyance. According to Targ, the term was first suggested by Ingo Swann in December 1971 during an experiment at the American Society for Psychical Research in New York City.

Remote viewing experiments have historically been criticized for lack of proper controls and repeatability. There is no scientific evidence that remote viewing exists, and the topic of remote viewing is generally regarded as pseudoscience.

The idea of remote viewing received renewed attention in the 1990s upon the declassification of documents related to the Stargate Project, a $20 million research program sponsored by the U.S. government that attempted to determine potential military applications of psychic phenomena. The program ran from 1975 to 1995, and ended after evaluators reached the conclusion that remote viewers consistently failed to produce any actionable intelligence information.

History

Early background

In early occult and spiritualist literature, remote viewing was known as telesthesia and travelling clairvoyance. Rosemary Guiley described it as "seeing remote or hidden objects clairvoyantly with the inner eye, or in alleged out-of-body travel."

The study of psychic phenomena by major scientists started in the mid-nineteenth century. Early researchers included Michael Faraday, Alfred Russel Wallace, Rufus Osgood Mason, and William Crookes. Their work predominantly involved carrying out focused experimental tests on specific individuals who were thought to be psychically gifted. Reports of apparently successful tests were met with much skepticism from the scientific community.

In the 1930s, J. B. Rhine expanded the study of paranormal performance into larger populations, by using standard experimental protocols with unselected human subjects. But, as with the earlier studies, Rhine was reluctant to publicize this work too early because of the fear of criticism from mainstream scientists.

This continuing skepticism, with its consequences for peer review and research funding, ensured that paranormal studies remained a fringe area of scientific exploration. However, by the 1960s, the prevailing counterculture attitudes muted some of the prior hostility. The emergence of what is termed "New Age" thinking and the popularity of the Human Potential Movement provoked a mini-renaissance that renewed public interest in consciousness studies and psychic phenomena and helped to make financial support more available for research into such topics.

In the early 1970s, Harold Puthoff and Russell Targ joined the Electronics and Bioengineering Laboratory at Stanford Research Institute (SRI, now SRI International) where they initiated studies of the paranormal that were, at first, supported with private funding from the Parapsychology Foundation and the Institute of Noetic Sciences.

In the late 1970s, the physicists John Taylor and Eduardo Balanovski tested the psychic Matthew Manning in remote viewing and the results proved "completely unsuccessful".

One of the early experiments, lauded by proponents as having improved the methodology of remote viewing testing and as raising future experimental standards, was criticized as leaking information to the participants by inadvertently leaving clues. Some later experiments had negative results when these clues were eliminated.

The viewers' advice in the "Stargate project" was always so unclear and non-detailed that it has never been used in any intelligence operation.

Decline and termination

In the early 1990s, the Military Intelligence Board, chaired by Defense Intelligence Agency chief Harry E. Soyster, appointed Army Colonel William Johnson to manage the remote viewing unit and evaluate its objective usefulness. Funding dissipated in late 1994 and the program went into decline. The project was transferred out of DIA to the CIA in 1995.

In 1995, the CIA hired the American Institutes for Research (AIR) to perform a retrospective evaluation of the results generated by the Stargate Project. Reviewers included Ray Hyman and Jessica Utts. Utts maintained that there had been a statistically significant positive effect, with some subjects scoring 5–15% above chance. Hyman argued that Utts' conclusion that ESP had been proven to exist, "is premature, to say the least." Hyman said the findings had yet to be replicated independently, and that more investigation would be necessary to "legitimately claim the existence of paranormal functioning". Based upon both of their studies, which recommended a higher level of critical research and tighter controls, the CIA terminated the $20 million project in 1995.  Time magazine stated in 1995 that three full-time psychics were still working on a $500,000-a-year budget at Fort Meade, Maryland, which would soon be closed.

The AIR report concluded that no usable intelligence data was produced in the program. David Goslin, of the American Institute for Research said, "There's no documented evidence it had any value to the intelligence community".

PEAR's Remote Perception program

Beginning in the late 1970s, the Princeton Engineering Anomalies Research Lab (PEAR) carried out extensive research on remote viewing. In a 1992 critique of these results, Hansen, Utts and Markwick concluded "The PEAR remote-viewing experiments depart from commonly accepted criteria for formal research in science. In fact, they are undoubtedly some of the poorest quality ESP experiments published in many years." The lab responded that "none of the stated complaints compromises the PEAR experimental protocols or analytical methods" and reaffirmed their results.

Following Utts' emphasis on replication and Hyman's challenge on interlaboratory consistency in the AIR report, PEAR conducted several hundred trials to see if they could replicate the SAIC and SRI experiments. They created an analytical judgment methodology to replace the human judging process that was criticized in past experiments, and they released a report in 1996. They felt the results of the experiments were consistent with the SRI experiments. However, statistical flaws have been proposed by others in the parapsychological community and within the general scientific community.

Scientific reception
A variety of scientific studies of remote viewing have been conducted. Early experiments produced positive results, but they had invalidating flaws. None of the more recent experiments have shown positive results when conducted under properly controlled conditions. This lack of successful experiments has led the mainstream scientific community to reject remote viewing, based upon the absence of an evidence base, the lack of a theory which would explain remote viewing, and the lack of experimental techniques which can provide reliably positive results.

Science writers Gary Bennett, Martin Gardner, Michael Shermer and professor of neurology Terence Hines describe the topic of remote viewing as pseudoscience.

C. E. M. Hansel, who evaluated the remote viewing experiments of parapsychologists such as Puthoff, Targ, John B. Bisha and Brenda J. Dunne, noted that there were a lack of controls and precautions were not taken to rule out the possibility of fraud. He concluded the experimental design was inadequately reported and "too loosely controlled to serve any useful function."

The psychologist Ray Hyman says that, even if the results from remote viewing experiments were reproduced under specified conditions, they would still not be a conclusive demonstration of the existence of psychic functioning. He blames this on the reliance on a negative outcome—the claims on ESP are based on the results of experiments not being explained by normal means. He says that the experiments lack a positive theory that guides as to what to control on them and what to ignore, and that "Parapsychologists have not come close to (having a positive theory) as yet".

Hyman also says that the amount and quality of the experiments on RV are far too low to convince the scientific community to "abandon its fundamental ideas about causality, time, and other principles", due to its findings still not having been replicated successfully under careful scrutiny.

Martin Gardner has written that the founding researcher Harold Puthoff was an active Scientologist prior to his work at Stanford University, and that this influenced his research at SRI. In 1970, the Church of Scientology published a notarized letter that had been written by Puthoff while he was conducting research on remote viewing at Stanford. The letter read, in part: "Although critics viewing the system Scientology from the outside may form the impression that Scientology is just another of many quasi-educational quasi-religious 'schemes,' it is in fact a highly sophistical and highly technological system more characteristic of modern corporate planning and applied technology". Among some of the ideas that Puthoff supported regarding remote viewing was the claim in the book Occult Chemistry that two followers of Madame Blavatsky, founder of theosophy, were able to remote-view the inner structure of atoms.

Michael Shermer investigated remote viewing experiments and discovered a problem with the target selection list. According to Shermer with the sketches only a handful of designs are usually used such as lines and curves which could depict any object and be interpreted as a "hit". Shermer has also written about confirmation and hindsight biases that have occurred in remote viewing experiments.

Various skeptic organizations have conducted experiments for remote viewing and other alleged paranormal abilities, with no positive results under properly controlled conditions.

Sensory cues

The psychologists David Marks and Richard Kammann attempted to replicate Russell Targ and Harold Puthoff's remote viewing experiments that were carried out in the 1970s at the Stanford Research Institute. In a series of 35 studies, they were unable to replicate the results so investigated the procedure of the original experiments. Marks and Kammann discovered that the notes given to the judges in Targ and Puthoff's experiments contained clues as to which order they were carried out, such as referring to yesterday's two targets, or they had the date of the session written at the top of the page. They concluded that these clues were the reason for the experiment's high hit rates. According to Terence Hines:

Thomas Gilovich has written:

According to Marks, when the cues were eliminated the results fell to a chance level. Marks was able to achieve 100 percent accuracy without visiting any of the sites himself but by using cues. James Randi has written that controlled tests by several other researchers, eliminating several sources of cuing and extraneous evidence present in the original tests, produced negative results. Students were also able to solve Puthoff and Targ's locations from the clues that had inadvertently been included in the transcripts.

Marks and Kamman concluded: "Until remote viewing can be confirmed in conditions which prevent sensory cueing the conclusions of Targ and Puthoff remain an unsubstantiated hypothesis." In 1980, Charles Tart claimed that a rejudging of the transcripts from one of Targ and Puthoff's experiments revealed an above-chance result. Targ and Puthoff again refused to provide copies of the transcripts and it was not until July 1985 that they were made available for study when it was discovered they still contained sensory cues. Marks and Christopher Scott (1986) wrote "considering the importance for the remote viewing hypothesis of adequate cue removal, Tart’s failure to perform this basic task seems beyond comprehension. As previously concluded, remote viewing has not been demonstrated in the experiments conducted by Puthoff and Targ, only the repeated failure of the investigators to remove sensory cues."

The information from the Stargate Project remote viewing sessions was vague and included a lot of irrelevant and erroneous data, it was never useful in any intelligence operation, and it was suspected that the project managers in some cases changed the reports so they would fit background cues.

Marks in his book The Psychology of the Psychic (2000) discussed the flaws in the Stargate Project in detail. He wrote that there were six negative design features of the experiments. The possibility of cues or sensory leakage was not ruled out, no independent replication, some of the experiments were conducted in secret making peer-review impossible. Marks noted that the judge Edwin May was also the principal investigator for the project and this was problematic making huge conflict of interest with collusion, cuing and fraud being possible. Marks concluded the project was nothing more than a "subjective delusion" and after two decades of research it had failed to provide any scientific evidence for remote viewing.

Marks has also suggested that the participants of remote viewing experiments are influenced by subjective validation, a process through which correspondences are perceived between stimuli that are in fact associated purely randomly.

Professor Richard Wiseman, a psychologist at the University of Hertfordshire, and a fellow of the Committee for Skeptical Inquiry (CSI) has pointed out several problems with one of the early experiments at SAIC, including information leakage. However, he indicated the importance of its process-oriented approach and of its refining of remote viewing methodology, which meant that researchers replicating their work could avoid these problems. Wiseman later insisted there were multiple opportunities for participants on that experiment to be influenced by inadvertent cues and that these cues can influence the results when they appear.

Selected RV study participants
 Ingo Swann, a prominent research participant in remote viewing
 Pat Price, an early remote viewer
 Joseph McMoneagle, an early remote viewer See: Stargate Project
 Courtney Brown, political scientist and founder of the Farsight Institute
 David Marks, a critic of remote viewing, after finding sensory cues and editing in the original transcripts generated by Targ and Puthoff at Stanford Research Institute in the 1970s
 Uri Geller, the subject of a study by Targ and Puthoff at Stanford Research Institute

See also
 Astral projection
 Body of light
 Edgar Cayce
 Extrasensory perception
 List of topics characterized as pseudoscience
 Lucid dreaming
 Parapsychology research at SRI
 Scrying
 Third eye
 The Men Who Stare at Goats (film)
 Suspect Zero (film)

Notes

Footnotes

Further reading
 
 Brown, Courtney. (2005). Remote Viewing: The Science and Theory of Nonphysical Perception. Farsight Press. 
 Gilovich, Thomas. (1993). How We Know What isn't So: Fallibility of Human Reason in Everyday Life. Free Press. 
 Gordon, Henry. (1988). Extrasensory Deception: ESP, Psychics, Shirley MacLaine, Ghosts, UFOs. Macmillan of Canada. 
 Marks, David. (2000). The Psychology of the Psychic (2nd Edition). Prometheus Books. 
 McMoneagle, Joseph. (2002). The Stargate Chronicles: Memoirs of a Psychic Spy. Hampton Roads. 
 Randi, James. (1982). Flim-Flam! Psychics, ESP, Unicorns, and Other Delusions. Prometheus Books.

External links
 Remote viewing – Skeptic's Dictionary

 
1971 neologisms
New Age practices
Psychic powers
Parapsychology
Pseudoscience